Sowa was the original language of south-central Pentecost island in Vanuatu. In the 20th century it was totally displaced by Apma, a neighbouring language. Sowa was closely related to Ske, another south Pentecost language.

Sowa was originally spoken on both western and eastern sides of Pentecost. The river at Melsisi formed the language's north-western boundary, and its range extended southwards to a creek near the village of Levizendam. 

Following the depopulation of Pentecost that occurred after the introduction of European diseases, men from Sowa-speaking areas were married women from other parts of Pentecost, who were mostly Apma speakers. As a result, by the 1960s, Apma had totally replaced Sowa as the predominant local language. The last native Sowa speaker, Maurice Tabi of Vanvat village, died in 2000.

Today, a few local people whose fathers or mothers were Sowa speakers still remember parts of the language, although none speak it fluently. A couple, including Isaiah Tabi Vahka of Waterfall Village and Adam Bulesisbwat of Lesuubelakan, compiled short written notes on Sowa in an attempt to ensure that the language was not lost. The only linguist to have studied Sowa while the language was still alive was David Walsh, who collected a vocabulary list in 1969. Andrew Gray, a British schoolteacher at Ranwadi College, worked with speakers' children in the late 2000s to try to reconstruct the basics of the language.

Some people in the former Sowa area see the language as a part of their cultural heritage and lament its loss. There is talk of reviving Sowa, although this is not a high priority for most local people, and records are insufficient to allow a fully authentic restoration of the language.

Status as a language
Given the close relationship between Sowa and Ske language (the two are reckoned by locals to have been mutually intelligible), a case could be made for classifying the two as dialects rather than as separate languages.

In his 1976 survey of New Hebrides Languages, Darrell Tryon classified Sowa as a separate language, calculating its cognacy with Ske at 77% (with 80% being the approximate threshold below which two forms are considered separate languages rather than mere dialects). However, in their 2001 survey, Lynch & Crowley did not recognise Sowa as a language, noting that Tryon's data suffered from significant margins of error.

Using an updated word list, Andrew Gray calculated the cognacy of Sowa and Ske at 82%. Sowa's status as a language is therefore borderline if considered on the basis of cognacy figures alone. However, local people perceive Sowa very much as a distinct language and not as a Ske dialect, and there are significant grammatical and phonological differences between Sowa and Ske.

Phonology
The consonants of Sowa were b, d, g, k, l, m, n, ng (as in English "singer"), p, r, s, t, bilabial v, w, z, and labiovelar bw, mw and pw. Sowa appears to have lacked h, although this letter occasionally appears in records of Sowa as a result of un-phonetic spelling and interference from other languages.

By comparison with related languages such as Apma and Raga, there appear to have been relatively few restrictions on the distribution of consonants. However, it appears that consonants occurring at the end of an utterance were modified according to Apma-like rules, with b, v and possibly w converted to p, d devoiced to t, g devoiced to k, and r dropped to produce a long vowel. Clusters of consonants within syllables were not permitted.

Unlike in neighbouring Ske, there was no prenasalization of consonants in Sowa.

In addition to the five standard vowels (a, e, i, o and u), Sowa appears to have had mid-high vowels é (intermediate between e and i) and ó (intermediate between o and u), like in Ske and Sa languages.

Long vowels (aa, ee, etc.) occurred as a result of the dropping of r at the ends of words, and are shown to have been distinct from short vowels by minimal pairs such as me "to be red" and mee (< mer) "to be black".

Grammar
Because no linguist ever worked directly with a native Sowa speaker, the language's grammar is poorly known. However, some of the basics can be deduced from the phrases that are remembered.

Pronouns
Personal pronouns were distinguished by person and number. They were not distinguished by gender.

The basic pronouns in Sowa were:

Nouns
Nouns in Sowa were generally not preceded by articles. Plurality was indicated by placing the pronoun néé ("them") or a number after the noun.

Nouns could be either free, or directly-possessed. Directly-possessed nouns were suffixed to indicate whom an item belonged to. For example:

dolok = my voice
dolom = your voice
dolon = his/her voice
dolon dasék = my mother's voice

Possession could also be indicated by the use of possessive classifiers, separate words that occur before or after the noun and take possessive suffixes. These classifiers were similar to those of Apma:

no- for general possessions (nog wakat, "my basket")
bile- for things that are cared for, such as crops and livestock (biled bó, "our pig")
a- for things to be eaten (am bwet, "your taro")
mwe- for things to be drunk (mwen ré, "his water")
na- for associations, over which the possessor has no control (vénu naik, "my home island")

The possessive suffixes were as follows:

A verb could be transformed into a noun by the addition of a nominalising suffix -an:

bwal = to fight (verb)
bwalan = a fight (noun)

Modifiers generally came after a noun:

vat = stone
vat alok = big stone
vat iru = two stones

Verbs
Verbs were preceded by markers providing information on the subject and the tense, aspect and mood of an action. Some of these are difficult to reconstruct, due to inconsistencies within and between sources, but a plausible set is:

Dual (two-person) forms incorporating a particle ra also existed, as in Ske, but are not well remembered.

Negative phrases began with the word atna ("absent"):

ni iko = I did it
atna ni iko = I didn't do it

In the imperative, verbs could occur on their own (unlike in Apma and Ske, in which they are always preceded by a subject pronoun). Verbs beginning with a pair of consonants, which would have been difficult to pronounce on their own, acquired an extra vowel in this situation:

mwi lse = I see
Lese! = Look!

Transitive and intransitive verb forms were distinguished, like in Apma and Ske. Transitive verbs were commonly followed with -né:

mwi rós = I move
mwi rós né vat = I move the stone

Like neighbouring languages, Sowa made extensive use of stative verbs for descriptive purposes.

Verbs in Sowa could be linked together in serial verb constructions.

Sample phrases

References

 Gray, Andrew. 2012. The Languages of Pentecost Island.
 Lynch, John and Crowley, Terry. 2001. Languages of Vanuatu: A New Survey and Bibliography.
 Tabi Vahka, Isaiah, 2006. Tamzon Nan Dutmekan Lon Dolod Ne Sowa (First Book of Our Language which is Sowa)
 Tryon, Darrell, 1976. New Hebrides Languages: An Internal Classification: Series C – No. 50. Pacific Linguistics.

External links
 The Languages of Pentecost Island – further information on Sowa

Languages of Vanuatu
Penama languages
Extinct languages of Oceania
Critically endangered languages